Christopher Franklin (born 16 September 1964) is an Australian stand up comedian and former sailor for the Royal Australian Navy. He is most famous for performing the song "Bloke" (a bogan parody of Meredith Brooks' song "Bitch"), which was certified platinum, reached No. 1 on the ARIA Charts and was the twelfth biggest selling single in Australia in 2000.  He lives in Launceston, Tasmania.

Early life
Franklin was born in Sydney, and lived from age 3 to 5 on Manus Island in Papua New Guinea. As a young adult, he spent eight years in the Royal Australian Navy as a chef, and was one of seven chosen to cook for the Queen during her visit to Australia in the 1980s. After this, Franklin quit the navy to take ten years off to travel Australia.

Entertainment career

Comedy career
Franklin has been performing comedy since October 1997. His accomplishments include:

 PBS Radio Golden Stom Award for Best Up & Coming Comedian
 National Triple J Raw Comedy winner for Best New Comedian
 Grand Finalist National Green Faces competition in Canberra
 Third prize - The Comedy Hotel Sydney's "Night of Nights"

Franklin has performed with numerous musicians and comedians, including Jimeoin, Steady Eddy, Garry Who, Carl Barron, Richard Stubbs, Elliot Goblet, Raymond J Bartholomew, Marty Fields, The Empty Pockets, John Robertson, Peter Rowsthorn, Bob Franklin, Stevie Starr, and Mr Methane.

During 2001, Franklin toured extensively with Steady Eddy in their live show Guess Who's Pissed. Franklin has also toured with The Radiators across Australia.

In 2006 a DVD was released called "Let bogans be bogans". It contains Chris Franklin's standup routine and video clips of his parody songs.

Music
Franklin's first CD single, "Bloke", a parody of Meredith Brooks' song "Bitch", was released on 31 January 2000 through EMI Music Australia. The song reached number fifteen on the charts in its first week in and subsequently achieved number one and platinum status with more than 120,000 sales. "Bloke" was the third highest selling single by an Australian artist of that year. The song was nominated in two categories at the ARIA Music Awards of 2000; namely, "Best Comedy Release" and "Highest Selling Single".

Franklin released a second single entitled "Mullet Head", a parody of the hit single "Gimme Head" by The Radiators, who perform live on the single. "Mullet Head" was nominated for "Best Comedy Release" at the ARIA Music Awards of 2001.

In 2006, Franklin contributed the song " " as the B-side to the Freedom of Thought single "Green and Gold (Song for the Socceroos)", which peaked at number 26 on the ARIA charts.

On 7 April 2020, Franklin released the single "Stay the F*** at home" with supergroup "Chris Franklin & The Isolators" in collaboration with various Australian music artists in response to the Coronavirus pandemic.

Albums

Singles

Television
Franklin has also appeared on television, including:

 Hit & Run (Comedychannel)
 Good News Week
 Live and Kicking (Channel 7 Melb)
 Recovery
 ABC Raw Comedy Special
 Channel 31 (Melb)
 Pizza (Fat Pizza) (SBS)
 Housos (SBS)
 The Footy Show (NRL) (Nine Network)
 The Footy Show (AFL) (Nine Network)
 Headliners (Foxtel)
 Bogan Hunters (7mate)

Radio
Franklin is a regular guest on Zinc 100.7 Rockshow with Wildy.

Awards and nominations

ARIA Music Awards
The ARIA Music Awards is an annual awards ceremony that recognises excellence, innovation, and achievement across all genres of Australian music. They commenced in 1987.

! 
|-
|rowspan="2"|2000
|rowspan="2"| "Bloke"
| ARIA Award for Highest Selling Single
| 
|rowspan="2"|
|-
| ARIA Award for Best Comedy Release
| 
|-
|2001
| "Mullet Head"
| Best Comedy Release
| 
|
|-

References

1964 births
Australian male comedians
Royal Australian Navy sailors
Living people